Every Child is an animated short film produced in 1979 by the National Film Board of Canada in association with UNICEF.

It is a film without words, incorporating sounds by Les Mîmes Électriques (The Electric Mimes).

Plot
This animated short tells the story of a child rejected from every home, then found by two tramps who give her love and tenderness.

Cast
 Bernard Carez
 Sophie Cowling as the Child
 Raymond Pollender

Production
Every Child was an UNICEF sponsored film created by the National Film Board of Canada in order to promote the Declaration of Children's Rights. The film was directed and animated by Eugene Fedorenko and written by Derek Lamb and Les Mîmes électriques. It had a budget of $67,778. Fedorenko later lost his job at the NFB due to budgetary problems in March 1980.

Awards
In 1980 Derek Lamb won an Oscar for Best Short Film, Animated at the Academy Awards, United States
Best Animation and Special Award, 1st Genie Awards, 1980
In 1980 Eugene Fedorenko won the OIAF Award for First Films at the Ottawa International Animation Festival

References

Works cited

External links
 
 
 Watch Every Child at NFB Web site

1979 films
1979 animated films
1970s animated short films
Best Animated Short Academy Award winners
Canadian animated short films
Films scored by Normand Roger
Films about orphans
Animated films without speech
Best Animated Short Film Genie and Canadian Screen Award winners
National Film Board of Canada animated short films
UNICEF
Films with live action and animation
French-language Canadian films
1970s English-language films
1970s Canadian films